Isidro Monge Pedroza (born April 11, 1951) is a Mexican retired Major League Baseball relief pitcher who pitched from 1975 to 1984.  He played Major League Baseball (MLB) for the California Angels, Cleveland Indians, Philadelphia Phillies, San Diego Padres and Detroit Tigers.

Career

Born in Agua Prieta, the Mexican state of Sonora, Monge moved to Brawley, California at age 16 and attended Brawley Union High School. He was drafted in the 24th round (562nd overall) of the 1970 June Baseball Draft by the California Angels.

Monge was called up to the Angels after going 14–9 with a 4.63 ERA for the Salt Lake City Gulls of the Pacific Coast League, and made his major league debut on September 12, 1975 against the Kansas City Royals at Royals Stadium pitching  innings in relief of Bill Singer getting no decision. He went 0–1 with one save and a 2.92 earned run average (ERA) in four appearances to begin the 1977 campaign before being traded along with Bruce Bochte and cash from the Angels to the Cleveland Indians for Dave LaRoche and Dave Schuler on May 11. 

He was traded from the Phillies to the Padres for Joe Lefebvre on May 22, 1983.

Monge went 49–40 in his 10-year career with a 3.53 ERA. He pitched 764 innings, striking out 471.
Hall of Famer Tony Gwynn of the San Diego Padres got his first hit off Monge on July 19, 1982 while he was pitching for the Philadelphia Phillies.

Monge was selected for the American League All-Star team in 1979, during which he had a record of 12–10 with a 2.40 ERA.

Later life
In 2010, Monge was hired as the pitching coach for the Sultanes de Monterrey. Previous coaching positions included pitching coach with the State College Spikes (2006), New Jersey Cardinals (2003–2005), Potomac Cannons (2002), Johnson City Cardinals (2001), and Peoria Chiefs (2000) all (at the time) part of the St. Louis Cardinals farm system. He was also the pitching coach for the Jamestown Jammers (then a part of the Detroit Tigers system) in 1995.  In the offseason, Monge works in the Mexican Winter League, coaching at third for the Venados de Mazatlán.

On June 14, 2004 he was inducted into the Mexican Professional Baseball Hall of Fame.

References

 1976 Baseball Register published by The Sporting News

External links

, or Retrosheet, or SABR Biography Project

1951 births
Águilas de Mexicali players
American League All-Stars
Baseball players from Sonora
California Angels players
Cleveland Indians players
Detroit Tigers players
El Paso Diablos players
El Paso Sun Kings players
Gold Coast Suns (baseball) players
Hawaii Islanders players
Idaho Falls Angels players
Living people
Major League Baseball pitchers
Major League Baseball players from Mexico
Mayos de Navojoa players
Mexican Baseball Hall of Fame inductees
Mexican expatriate baseball players in the United States
Minor league baseball coaches
Nashville Sounds players
Ostioneros de Guaymas players
People from Brawley, California
Philadelphia Phillies players
Quad Cities Angels players
Salt Lake City Gulls players
San Diego Padres players
Shreveport Captains players
Tomateros de Culiacán players
Venados de Mazatlán players
West Palm Beach Tropics players
Yaquis de Obregón players
People from Agua Prieta